The Irchester Narrow Gauge Railway Museum is a small railway museum and metre gauge railway near Irchester, near Wellingborough in Northamptonshire, England.

History 
The area around Wellingborough was rich in iron ore. A quarry opened in Irchester around 1872 to extract the iron ore, which was mainly processed in the local iron works. Ironstone continued to be mined up until closure of the quarries in 1969.

In 1971 the Northamptonshire County Council opened the Irchester Country Park, which is located on the site of the former opencast ironstone quarries. The park has a network of walks, a visitors centre and a children's play area in a grass and woodland setting. The museum was set-up within the park in 1987, inside a purpose built building to the west of the original ironstone railway maintenance yard. Access to the museum is along a footpath which follows the line of the ironstone railway trackbed. There are over 40 items of narrow gauge railway rolling stock including four steam locomotives and six diesel locomotives. A 250-metre long demonstration track with a gauge of  has been laid in the park. The original water tank has been recreated using a tank of similar design, complete with lettering matching the original.

Locomotives

See also

References

External links
 Irchester Narrow Gauge Railway Museum - official site

North Northamptonshire
Metre gauge railways in England
Railway museums in England
Narrow-gauge railway museums in the United Kingdom